Mahmud II ( 1105 – 1131) was the Seljuk sultan of Baghdad from 1118–1131 following the death of his father Muhammad I Tapar. At the time Mahmud was fourteen, and ruled over Iraq and Persia.

Biography 
During Mahmud's early reign, his vassal king Garshasp II, who was a favorite of his father Muhammad I, fell into disgrace. Slander about him spread to the court that made him lose confidence, and made Mahmud send a military force to Yazd where Garshasp was arrested and jailed in Jibal, while Yazd was granted to the royal cupbearer. Garshasp, however, escaped and returned to Yazd, where he requested protection from Mahmud's rival Ahmad Sanjar (Garshasp's wife was the sister of Ahmad). Garshasp urged Ahmad to invade the domains of Mahmud in Central Persia, and gave him information on how to march to Central Persia, and the ways to combat Mahmud. Ahmad accepted and advanced with an army to the west in 1119, where he together with five kings defeated Mahmud at Saveh. The kings who aided Ahmad during the battle were Garshasp II himself, the emirs of Sistan and of Khwarazm, and two other unnamed kings. After being victorious, Ahmad then restored the domains of Garshasp II.

Ahmad then proceeded as far as Baghdad, whereupon Mahmud was married to one of Sanjar's daughters, made his uncle's heir, and forced to give up strategic territories in northern Persia.

Mahmud's younger brother Mas'ud revolted against him in 1120, but the civil war ended the following year due to the intervention of the atabeg of Mosul, Aqsunqur al-Bursuqi, and Mas'ud was pardoned. In 1126, al-Bursuqi was murdered by Assassins, believed have been under orders from Mahmud. In 1127, he appointed Anushirvan ibn Khalid as his vizier, but had him removed from the office the following year. In 1129 Mahmud officially recognized the authority of Imad al-Din Zengi, who had supported him against a revolt led by al-Mustarshid, caliph of Baghdad, in Syria and northern Iraq.

Mahmud, then aged 26, died in 1131. His death was followed by a civil war between his son Dawud, and his brothers Mas'ud, Suleiman-Shah, and Toghrul II.  His other son Alp Arslan ibn Mahmud was ruler of Mosul with atabeg Zengi.

Family
Around 1119, Mahmud married Mah-i Mulk Khatun, daughter of Sultan Ahmad Sanjar. She died in 1122. Sanjar sent another daughter, Amir Sitti Khatun, to be Mahmud's wife. She died in 1129. They had a daughter, Gawhar Nasab Khatun. Another wife was Ata Khatun, the daughter of Garshasp II, the son of Ali ibn Faramurz and Arslan Khatun, the daughter of Chaghri Beg. They had a son Ala al-Daula Ata Khan. Another wife, who was the mother of Mahmud's son, Alp Arslan, died while living at the residence of Aq Sunqur al-Bursuqi. One of his concubines was the mother of his daughter Terken Khatun, who married Sulaiman Shah, one of the great-grandsons of Qavurt.

References

Sources 

1100s births
1131 deaths
Seljuk rulers
People of the Nizari–Seljuk wars